Mundo, meaning "world" in Spanish and Portuguese,  may refer to:

Places
 Mundo (river), a river in south-eastern Spain

People
 Mundo (general) (died 536), East Roman general
 Carles Mundó (born 1976), Spanish lawyer and politician from Catalonia
 Edmundo Suárez (1916-1978), Spanish footballer
 Liza del Mundo (born 1975), Filipino-American voice actress
 Joan Maria Mundó i Freixas (1877–1932), Spanish explorer and diamond trader
 Johnny Mundo, ring name of American professional wrestler John Morrison
 Miguel Pedro Mundo (1937–1999), American Catholic bishop in Brazil
 Raffaele Armando Califano Mundo (1857–1930), Italian painter

Other uses
 Mundo (album), a 2003 album by Rubén Blades
 Mundo, a 2016 album by Mariza
Mundo, a 2018 song by IV of Spades

See also
 El Mundo (disambiguation)
 Mondo (disambiguation)
 Mundus (disambiguation)